Klein is a singer-songwriter and producer from South London, England. She released the EP Tommy on UK label Hyperdub in 2017 and has received praise for her albums Lifetime (2019) and Frozen (2020) on her record label ijn inc.

Biography
Klein lives in South London, and comes from a Nigerian background. A fan of gospel music and theatre, she wrote poetry before moving to production as a hobby, receiving some early encouragement from musicians Mica Levi and Arca. After independently releasing the projects ONLY and Lagata in 2016, she garnered a cult audience and critical praise from sources such as The Wire and Boomkat. 

Klein released Tommy to the UK label Hyperdub in 2017, appearing on Laurel Halo’s album Dust and releasing her label debut EP Tommy later that year, receiving positive reviews from publications such as Tiny Mix Tapes and Pitchfork Media. In 2018 she directed and scored Care, a fantasy musical inspired by Disney princesses and the UK care system; it premiered at London's ICA in February 2018.

Music
Klein's work has been described as "grainy pop collages," with elements like R&B-inspired vocals, heavily manipulated audio samples, and surreal metallic drones. AllMusic called her work "an utterly unique, surreal blend of R&B and experimental electronics." She assembles her tracks in sound editing program Audacity, and cites some of her major influences as singer Brandy, composer Andrew Lloyd Webber, rapper Soulja Boy, and the reality TV show Love & Hip Hop: Atlanta. Klein describes her music with the word "spiral" as both a verb and adjective.

Discography
LPs 
ONLY (2016, self-release)
Lifetime (2019, ijn inc.)
Frozen (2020, ijn inc.)
Harmattan (2021, Pentatone)
Cave in the Wind (2022, Parkwuud Entertainment)
Star in the Hood (2022, Parkwuud Entertainment)

EPs
Lagata (2016, self-release)
Tommy (2017, Hyperdub)
cc (2018, self-release)

References

English women in electronic music
21st-century Black British women singers
English record producers
English experimental musicians
Hyperdub artists
British women record producers
Singers from London